In chemistry, there are three series of binary phosphorus halides, containing phosphorus in the oxidation states +5, +3 and +2. All compounds have been described, in varying degrees of detail, although serious doubts have been cast on the existence of PI5. Mixed chalcogen halides also exist.

Oxidation state +5 (PX5) 

In the gas phase the phosphorus pentahalides have trigonal bipyramidal molecular geometry as explained by VSEPR theory.

Phosphorus pentafluoride is a relatively inert gas, notable as a mild Lewis acid and a fluoride ion acceptor. It is a fluxional molecule in which the axial (ax) and equatorial (eq) fluorine atoms interchange positions by the Berry pseudorotation mechanism.  

Phosphorus pentachloride, phosphorus pentabromide, and phosphorus heptabromide are ionic in the solid and liquid states; PCl5 is formulated as PCl4+PCl6–, but in contrast, PBr5 is formulated as PBr4+ Br−, and PBr7 is formulated as PBr4+ Br3−.  They are widely used as chlorinating and brominating agents in organic chemistry.

Oxidation state +3 (PX3) 

The phosphorus(III) halides are the best known of the three series. They are usually prepared by direct reaction of the elements, or by transhalogenation.

Phosphorus trifluoride is used as a ligand in coordination chemistry, where it resembles carbon monoxide.  Phosphorus trichloride is a major industrial chemical and widely used starting material for phosphorus chemistry.  Phosphorus tribromide is used in organic chemistry to convert alcohols to alkyl bromides and carboxylic acids to acyl bromides (e.g. in the Hell-Volhard-Zelinsky reaction). Phosphorus triiodide also finds use in organic chemistry, as a mild oxygen acceptor.

The trihalides are fairly readily oxidized by chalcogens to give the corresponding oxyhalides or equivalents.

Oxidation state +2 (P2X4) 

Phosphorus(II) halides may be prepared by passing an electric discharge through a mixture of the trihalide vapour and hydrogen gas. The relatively stable P2I4 is known to have a trans, bent configuration similar to hydrazine and finds some uses in organic syntheses, the others are of purely academic interest at the present time.  Diphosphorus tetrabromide is particularly poorly described. They are subhalides of phosphorus.

Oxyhalides,thiohalides and selehalides

The oxyhalides may be prepared from the corresponding trihalides by reaction with organic peroxides or ozone: they are sometimes referred to as phosphoryl halides.

The thiohalides, also known as thiophosphoryl halides may be prepared from the trihalides by reaction with elemental sulfur in an inert solvent.  The corresponding selenohalides are also known.

The oxyhalides and thiohalides are significantly more electrophilic than the corresponding phosphorus(III) species, and present a significant toxic hazard.

References

External links
WebElements
NIST Standard Reference Database

 
Inorganic phosphorus compounds